"&Run" (pronounced "and run") is the seventh single by American indie pop band, Sir Sly. The song is the fourth single off of the band's second album, Don't You Worry, Honey. The single was released on June 30, 2017 via a YouTube video through Interscope Records. The song was also featured in the soundtrack for FIFA 18.

Music video 
The music video for the track was released on December 7, 2017. The video features the band going through daily life preparing for the shooting of a music video, and examining sights for the video.

Track listing

Charts

Weekly charts

Year-end charts

References

External links 
 &Run Lyrics at Genius

2017 singles
2017 songs
Sir Sly songs
Interscope Records singles